Bragado Partido is a  partido of Buenos Aires Province in Argentina.

Settlements
 Bragado
 Asamblea
 Comodoro Py
 General Eduardo O´Brien
 Irala 
 La Limpia
 Máximo Fernández, 
 Mechita 
 Olascoaga
 Warnes

Attractions
 Parque Gral. San Martín

External links

 
 La Voz de Bragado, newspaper
 La Ciudad Hoy 
 Bragado Informa
 Bragado lake

1865 establishments in Argentina
Partidos of Buenos Aires Province